Martin Blaha (born 8 August 1985) is a Czech football goalkeeper who plays for SK Sigma Olomouc.

External links
 

1985 births
Living people
Czech footballers
Association football goalkeepers
Czech First League players
SK Sigma Olomouc players
SFC Opava players